Sackville Currie (born 28 December 1955) is an Irish modern pentathlete. He competed at the 1980 Summer Olympics.

References

External links
 

1955 births
Living people
Irish male modern pentathletes
Olympic modern pentathletes of Ireland
Modern pentathletes at the 1980 Summer Olympics